Lim Nee Soon (12 November 1879 – 20 March 1936) was a Singaporean banker and businessman who promoted social and community matters, and was a respected community leader in Singapore. Lim was of Peranakan descent, with ancestry from Chenghai District, Shantou in Guangdong, China.

He was a rubber magnate and was nicknamed the "pineapple king" for being the leading pineapple planter in the region. He was also a banker, contractor and general commission agent. He was the first general manager of the Bukit Sembawang Rubber Company Limited, formed in 1908. Nee Soon and Company was formed in 1911.

As a Chinese Peranakan, known as "Baba" locally, he was affectionately known as Bah Soon Pah. Bah Soon Pah Road was named after him.

Early life
Lim Nee Soon was born in Kampong Glam, Singapore. His family was from Shantou, Guangdong, China. His father died when he was eight and his maternal grandfather, a merchant, took care of him. Lim was educated in English at the St. Joseph's Institution, and then later, at the Anglo Chinese School.

Career
Lim was one of the pioneers that opened up Sembawang. He served on the Rural Board from 1913 to 1921 and was also appointed a Justice of Peace. In the field of education, he was one of the founders of The Chinese High School and also a member of the Raffles College Committee.
He was the President of the Singapore Chinese Chamber of Commerce for two periods, from 1921-1922, and 1925-1926.

Later life
Lim, along with his uncle Teo Eng Hock, were the leading members of the Teochew clan association Teochew Poit Ip Huay Kuan, and was a close friend of Dr Sun Yat Sen.

He died on the way home from a trip to China and his embalmed body was scheduled to be brought back to Singapore. However, the Chinese government requested to give him a State burial and so he was buried in Nanjing, near the mausoleum of his close friend, Dr Sun Yat Sen.

Family
Lim married Ms. Wi Peck Hay and had 3 sons and 6 daughters. His sons Lim Chong Kuo and Lim Chong Pang later also became prominent merchants and community figures. One of his daughter, Lim Chit Geck, married Oei Tjong Tiong, son of Chinese-Indonesian Businessman, Oei Tiong Ham.

Legacy
Nee Soon Road was officially named in 1950 by the Rural Board to facilitate postal services. Nee Soon also owned a large plot of land in the area and several roads in this area are named after his business concerns and family members. For example, Chong Kuo Road is named after his eldest son Lim Chong Kuo, and Chong Pang City his second son Lim Chong Pang.

The residential town of Yishun in the northern part of Singapore, is also named after him. Although originally named Nee Soon, the name was subsequently romanized to its current appellation, to reflect the Singapore government's move to use standardised Mandarin over the unstandardised Chinese variants prominent amongst local dialect groups.

References

Secondary sources

External links
 Genealogy entry of Lim Nee Soon

1879 births
1936 deaths
Singaporean bankers
Singaporean chief executives
Peranakan people in Singapore
Singaporean people of Teochew descent
People from British Malaya
Anglo-Chinese School alumni